Frederic William Boatwright (January 28, 1868 – October 31, 1951) was president of Richmond College, now the University of Richmond, from 1895 to 1946.

Born in White Sulphur Springs, West Virginia, Boatwright entered Richmond College in 1883 at the age of 15.  He graduated with a Master of Arts degree in 1888 and pursued graduate study at the University of Halle, Sorbonne, and the University of Leipzig. He married Ellen Moore Thomas on December 23, 1890. Elected president of Richmond College in 1895 at the age of twenty-seven, Boatwright led the university for 51 years, one of the longest terms of service of any college president.
In 1914, under Dr. Boatwright's leadership, the College moved from the Fan district of downtown Richmond to its current West End campus.

Boatwright Memorial Library, opened in 1955 on the school's campus, is named in his honor.  Earl Hamner Jr., creator of the hit CBS-TV series The Waltons, attended Richmond College during Boatwright's tenure, and named the fictional Boatwright University where the character of John-Boy Walton attended college after him.

References

External links
History of the University of Richmond: People: Frederic William Boatwright
Frederic William Boatwright - A History
A look back: Boatwright Library turns 50

|-

1868 births
University of Richmond alumni
University of Paris alumni
University of Halle alumni
Leipzig University alumni
Presidents of the University of Richmond
1951 deaths
People from White Sulphur Springs, West Virginia
American expatriates in France
American expatriates in Germany